CJ the DJ is an animated television series and sitcom created first broadcast on ABC3. The show was created by Stu Connolly and Mark Gravas.
Fifty-two episodes were produced for the first season. Two episodes are often broadcast together, creating an impression that there are only twenty-six episodes in the first season.

Overview
CJ The DJ follows the adventures of a 13-year-old girl with the nickname of CJ, with Lesley and Si they form a group of DJ wannabes and together try to make it to the big leagues by playing gigs, promoting themselves and practicing. However the town she lives in, no one wants to hear about her.

Characters
Cathleen Jones aka CJ is Charley Jones’ older sister. She is a 13-year-old girl who aspires to be a DJ. She loves not being like everyone else and has a unique view on the world.

Lesley Smiles is one of CJ's friends, she is the complete opposite to CJ but they are friends because they are both individuals.
 
Si is CJ's best friend and neighbor, he is a born musician and has a passion for classical music. His background is New Zealander.
 
Arnis owns a record store called "A-Trax", He gives CJ her gigs and sees potential in her.
 
Lyle hangs out at Arnis' store every day after school he also works there for free. He seems to secretly have feelings for CJ although teases and bullies her, much like Helga does to Arnold in 'Hey Arnold'.
 
The Patel Twins want to be DJs only for the fame, they usually work at their dad's convenience store, They are jealous of CJ and steal her gigs, songs and even her name and cause numerous problems for herself and her friends.

Charley Jones is Cathleen Jones’ younger sister and the girlfriend of Goh. She is ten, however wants to be sixteen, she loves to shop and usually pokes fun at Cathleen Jones’ fashion sense.

Gene Jones is CJ and Charley Jones’ father. He has a band that has limited appeal to most people. He lives like he is a young person.

Marsha Jones is CJ and Charley Jones’ mother. She's the no-nonsense voice of authority in the household, and the primary source of income for the family, usually appearing in her business suit. However, in her youth she was the lead guitarist and vocalist for an all-girl punk band.

Mr. Truman is the evil science teacher and recurring antagonist who appears in various episodes.

Episodes

Multimedia

DVD releases 

On 1 July 2010, the Australian Broadcasting Company released the first DVD of CJ The DJ, featuring the first eight episodes.

Digital downloads 
CJ the DJ Series 1 Volumes 1 (Episodes 1 - 26) and 2 (Episodes 27 - 52) are available for download at the ABC Online Store.

ABC iView
CJ the DJ was released on ABC iView for public viewing, though each episode was only available for viewing over a limited amount of time.

International broadcast
Brazil: Gloob
Israel: Arutz HaYeladim (סי ג'יי הדי ג'יי)
Portugal: RTP2
Malaysia: TV2

References

External links
CJ the DJ at IMDb

2000s Australian animated television series
2010s Australian animated television series
2009 Australian television series debuts
2010 Australian television series endings
Australian children's animated comedy television series
Australian flash animated television series
English-language television shows
Teen animated television series
Australian Broadcasting Corporation original programming